The Gangster (Spanish: El gángster) is a 1965 Mexican film. It was directed by Luis Alcoriza.

External links
 

1965 films
Mexican crime comedy-drama films
1960s Spanish-language films
Films directed by Luis Alcoriza
1960s Mexican films